The Black is Never Far is the third studio album by American doom metal band Place of Skulls. It was released in 2006 on the Exile on Mainstream label. Scott Weinrich left the band prior to the recording in order to focus on The Hidden Hand.

Track listing 
All songs written by Victor Griffin except where noted.

 1. "Prisoner's Creed" – 2:50
 2. "Sense of Divinity" – 4:12
 3. "Darkest Hour" – 5:59
 4. "Interlude" – 0:10
 5. "Apart from Me" (Cornelius, Griffin) – 4:41
 6. "The Black Is Never Far" – 6:01
 7. "We the Unrighteous" – 2:38
 8. "Interlude" – 0:13
 9. "Masters of Jest" – 4:10
 10. "Interlude" – 0:13
 11. "Lookin' for a Reason" – 6:26
 12. "Relentless" – 4:28
 13. "Changed Heart" – 3:38

Personnel 
 Victor Griffin – guitar, vocals, producer
 Lee Abney – bass, backing vocals
 Dennis Cornelius – bass, vocals, backing vocals
 Charles Robinson – backing vocals
 Tim Tomaselli – drums, backing vocals
 Chastity Brown – saxophone
 Travis Wyrick – producer, mastering, mixing 
 Mike Dearing – engineer
 Andreas Kohl – artwork, design, layout design

References 

2006 albums
Place of Skulls (band) albums
Albums produced by Travis Wyrick